On 4 March 2013, a Fokker 50 operated by Compagnie Africaine d'Aviation on a domestic cargo flight from Lodja to Goma, Democratic Republic of the Congo, crashed in poor weather on approach to Goma Airport. There were nine people on board, of which six were killed. No fatalities were reported on the ground, despite the aircraft crashing into a populated area.

Accident
At 17:55 local time, the aircraft crashed in an empty lot in the middle of the city. No distress calls were made prior to the crash.

There were nine people on board the aircraft, including six airline employees—a crew of five and a security guard—and three passengers. All six employees were killed in the accident. Except for the pilot, a 46-year-old Russian national named Alexander Bazhenov, the dead were all from the Congo. The Russian consul to the Democratic Republic of the Congo confirmed that a Russian national was on board.

Aircraft

The aircraft involved in the accident was a twin-turboprop Fokker 50, powered by two Pratt & Whitney Canada PW125B engines; it first flew in 1992 with registration PH-LXJ. Having serial number 20270, it was delivered to AirUK in 1994 and re-registered G-UKTE. This registration was kept following the rebranding of Air UK to KLM uk in 1998. KLM Cityhopper re-registered the aircraft as PH-LXJ in 2003, and returned it to the lessor in 2010. In March of the same year, it was re-registered 9Q-CBD and delivered to Compagnie Africaine d'Aviation. The aircraft was 20 years old at the time of the accident.

Aftermath
Following the crash, the Ministry of Transport of the Democratic Republic of the Congo announced a re-certification of all airlines having an operator's certificate issued in the country that were subject to a ban in the European Union.

See also
List of airlines banned in the EU
Transport in the Democratic Republic of the Congo

References

External links

Aviation accidents and incidents in the Democratic Republic of the Congo
Accidents and incidents involving the Fokker 50
Compagnie Africaine d'Aviation crash
2013 in the Democratic Republic of the Congo
Goma
March 2013 events in Africa